The CONCACAF Awards are an association football award given annually to honor players, match officials and coaches from the North American region. It was established in 2013.

Criteria 
Players, Coaches and Referees of any nationality are eligible to be nominated, so long as they meet at least one of the following criteria:

 1. Have played/coached/refereed in an official CONCACAF tournament at club or national level
 2. Have played/coached/refereed for a CONCACAF member national team in a FIFA-sanctioned international competition
 3. Have played/coached/refereed in a domestic league within CONCACAF's territory.

For each award, an initial shortlist of 20 nominees was established by CONCACAF's 41 Member Associations and CONCACAF competitions' Technical Study Groups.

The final shortlist is voted on by three groups; Member Associations' national team coaches and captains, media, and fans. Each group's votes will provide a third of the total outcome.

Male award winners

Player of the Year

Goalkeeper of the Year

Coach of the Year

Referee of the Year

Female award winners

Player of the Year

Goalkeeper of the Year

Coach of the Year

Referee of the Year

Mixed

Goal of the Year

See also
 List of sports awards honoring women

References 

Association football in North America
Awards established in 2013
Women's association football trophies and awards